Monte Leon Brethauer (April 8, 1931 – October 14, 1994) was an American football end, defensive back and punter who played in the National Football League. He played college football at Oregon.

Early life and high school
Brethauer was born to Volga German parents and grew up in Portland, Oregon. He attended Jefferson High School, where he was named first-team All-Portland Interscholastic League twice in football.

College career
Brethauer was a three year starter for the Oregon Ducks at end. He led the team in receiving and set a school record in catches all three years. Brethauer finished as the Ducks' career receptions leader with 101 catches. As a senior, he caught 41 passes for 486 yards and two touchdowns and was named second-team All-Pacific Coast Conference.

Professional career
Brethauer was selected in the 24th round of the 1953 NFL Draft by the Baltimore Colts. He caught 10 passes for 133 yards on offense and intercepted a pass on defense as a rookie during the Colts' inaugural season. Brethauer was drafted into the Army after the season and missed 1954 and was re-signed by the Colts after being discharged in 1955. Brethauer was waived during training camp in 1956.

References

1931 births
1994 deaths
People of Volga German descent
Players of American football from Portland, Oregon
American football ends
American football defensive backs
American football punters
Jefferson High School (Portland, Oregon) alumni
Oregon Ducks football players
Baltimore Colts players